Votebank (also spelled vote-bank or vote bank), in the political discourse of India, is a term referring to a loyal bloc of voters from a single community, who consistently back a certain candidate or political formation in democratic elections. Such behavior is often the result of an expectation of benefits, whether real or imagined, from the political formations, often at the cost of other communities. Votebank politics is the practice of creating and maintaining votebanks through divisive policies. As it encourages voting on the basis of self-interest of certain groups, often against their better judgement, it is considered harmful to the principles of representative democracy. Here, community may be of a caste, religion, language, or subnation.

Etymology
The term was first used by noted Indian sociologist, M. N. Srinivas in his 1955 paper entitled The Social System of a Mysore Village. He used it in the context of political influence exerted by a patron over a client. Later, the expression was used by F. G. Bailey, a professor of anthropology at the University of California, San Diego, in his 1959 book Politics and Social Change, to refer to the electoral influence of the caste leader. This is the usage that has since become popular.

Examples
Some of the first identified votebanks were along caste lines. Others based on other community characteristics, such as religion and language, have also occurred. Votebanks are generally considered undesirable in electoral politics. For example,  argues that votebanks based on either caste or religion stand in the way of secularisation.  identifies accusations of votebanking as a rhetorical tool used by Hindu nationalists in complaints about special rights or privileges granted to non-Hindus in India. Other examples include:

In 1989, the Badaga people of South India petitioned the Indian government to be recognized as an official tribe, demonstrating en masse on 15 May of that year to imply the strength of the Badaga votebank.

Remedy
Some argue that the Votebank politics can be disabled by limiting the provisions of Tenth Schedule of Indian Constitution to a few critical issues.

See also 
 Ethnocultural politics in the United States
 Client politics
 Clientelism
 Constituency
 Indian politics
 Identity politics
 Electoral system
 Political campaigning
 Social disintegration
 Blocks of Five
 Red states and blue states

References

Bibliography

Further reading

 Shourie, Arun (2012). Falling over backwards: An essay on reservations and judicial populism. New Delhi: HarperCollins Publishers. 
 Syed Ali Mujtaba, ‘Monolith India’ and the vote bank, Himal South Asian, 2004

Political terminology in India
Elections in India
Identity politics in India
Muslim politics in India